Ananga Kumar Patnaik (born 3 June 1949) is an Indian jurist and a former judge of the Supreme Court of India.

Early life and education
Patnaik was born on 3 June 1949. He is the son of Gopal Chandra Patnaik, an Indian businessman and Shantilata Patnaik. He did his schooling from Rajkumar College, Raipur and graduated from University of Delhi with honours in political science. He then pursued his Bachelor of Laws degree from Madhusudan Law College in Cuttack. He was  selected by the Rotary Foundation in Group Study Exchange Programme in 1976 and  went to New Jersey, United States  for study of institutions of America  and its people.

Legal practice 
He enrolled with the State Bar Council of Orissa in the year 1974. As an advocate, he practiced in the High Court of Orissa, and subordinate courts & tribunals in the state. He also appeared in several matters before the Supreme Court of India. He has specialized in commercial law and constitutional law. From 1989 to 1990, he was the standing counsel for Orissa State Road Transportation Corporation and also the senior standing counsel for Commercial Tax Department of the Government of Orissa between 1990 and 1994.

Judgeship 
He was elevated as an Additional Judge of the High Court of Orissa on 13 January 1994. Subsequently, on 7 February 1994, he was transferred to the Gauhati High Court as an Additional Judge. He was made a permanent judge (puisne judge) of the Gauhati High Court in 1995. In 2002 he was transferred to the High Court of Orissa, where he subsequently became the senior most puisne judge of Orissa's High Court. In that capacity he served as the Executive Chairman of the Orissa State Legal Services Authority, which provides legal aid to petitioners in the State of Orissa.

He became Chief Justice of the High Court of Chhattisgarh on 14 March 2005. He was praised by the then Chief Justice of India Ramesh Chandra Lahoti for his role in the running of Chhattisgarh High Court. Later that year he became Chief Justice of the High Court of Madhya Pradesh, serving there for four years. During his tenure as the Chief Justice of both these states he was known for his bold judgements and was seen to be a judge who was pro poor and strongly supported the underprivileged classes.

On 17 November 2009, he was appointed a judge of the Supreme Court of India which he served till his retirement on 2 June 2014. After retirement he was offered the post of chairman of Odisha State Human Rights Commission which he refused as he wanted to stay in Delhi.

He was nominated by the then Chief Justice of India as the Chairman of the Supreme Court Legal Services Committee. He was also nominated by the CJI who is the ex-officio President of Indian Law Institute, as the Chairman of the Committee on “Constitutional Law and Allied Subjects” for the project of the Indian Law Institute on Restatement of Indian Law.

Notable work 
He was a member of the "In-House Committee" to probe into the allegations made against Justice Soumitra Sen. The committee concluded that Soumitra Sen was guilty of misconduct and misconduct disclosed is so serious that it calls for initiation of proceedings for his removal. Rajya Sabha accepted the motion of impeachment against him. He resigned ahead of similar impeachment motion against him in the Lok Sabha.

He was a part of the bench which on 27 February 2012 ordered the Government of India to implement the ambitious interlinking of rivers project in a time-bound manner and appointed a high-powered committee for its planning and implementation.

On 16 March 2012, he became a part of a special two-judge bench (constituted by Chief Justice of India Justice S H Kapadia) for hearing all cases arising out of 2G spectrum case.

On 26 October 2018 Supreme Court of India ordered a Central Vigilance Commissioner inquiry under his supervision against CBI Director Alok Verma.

Honours
In March 2012, Patnaik was conferred with the degree of Doctor of Law (Honoris Causa) by the Utkal University.

References 

1949 births
Living people
Justices of the Supreme Court of India
Judges of the Madhya Pradesh High Court
Judges of the Orissa High Court
Judges of the Gauhati High Court
Chief Justices of Chhattisgarh High Court
20th-century Indian judges
20th-century Indian lawyers
21st-century Indian judges